Ola Olstad was a Norwegian zoologist and polar explorer. 

Olstad Glacier on Peter I island is named after him.

Exploration 
Oldstad joined the Norvegia I expedition to Antarctica from 1927 to 1928.

Olstad led the Norvegia II expedition to Antarctica from 1928 to 1929. It was on this expedition that Peter I island was claimed for Norway on 2 February 1929.

References 

Norwegian polar explorers
Explorers of Antarctica